The Sukhoi Su-8 or DDBSh ( - Twin-engine two-seat armored ground attack aircraft) was a Soviet prototype ground-attack aircraft of World War II.

Development
While Sukhoi was perfecting the light Sukhoi Su-6 attack aircraft, the OKB also developed the massive, heavily armed and armored Su-8. In May 1942, the Soviet military commanders had realized the need for an aircraft to support ground offensives operating at a great distance from their airfields, and capable of striking enemy lines of communication to the rear of the front lines. Design work was conducted at an accelerated pace, with work on the airframe commencing from August 1942, even before the drawings were completed on 20 September 1942.

Two prototypes were completed at Plant Number 19 in Molotov in 1943, the first in May and the second in August, with work hampered by the Nazi invasion and need to evacuate the Sukhoi Design Bureau to Tushino. The first flight test was not made until 11 March 1944, and testing continued to the end of the year. Flight testing was delayed due to unavailability of Shvetsov M-71 engines. Although testing was successful, the Su-8 was not approved for mass production. By this time, the Soviet armies had reached the borders of Nazi Germany, and the need for an aircraft with a longer range than the existing Ilyushin Il-2 was no longer a priority.

An attempt to re-engine the aircraft with Mikulin AM-42 engines did not see further development.

The Su-8 was of mixed construction. The cockpit area was armoured, with an aluminum mid-fuselage and a wooden monocoque tail. The wings were of steel and aluminum construction with plywood outer sections. The twin rudders were of all-metal construction. In addition to the cockpit, the engines, fuel tanks and oil coolers were fully armoured, with a total armour weight of 1,680 kg (3,705 lb), more than twice the weight of the armour shell on an Ilyushin Il-2.

Specifications (Su-8 / DDBSh)

References

External links

Su-08
1940s Soviet attack aircraft